This page attempts to list mosques in the city of Medina, Saudi Arabia, in a chronological order.

Era of Moḥammad

Rashidunids

Abu Bakr Mosque (مسجد أبي بكر الصديق): It is located at the south-western flank of the Prophet’s Mosque, and north-west of the Masjid al-Ghamama.
Al-Ahzab mosque, 715 ad.
Al-Einein mosque
Al-Fuqair Mosque
Al-Ijabah Mosque
Al Jum'ah Mosque
Al-Mostarah mosque
Al-Rayah mosque
Amr Bin Al-Khatab mosque
As-Sabaq Mosque: also known as the Bani Zuraiq Mosque was a mosque located in Medina, north-west of al-Masjid an-Nabawi.
As-Sajadah Mosque
Bani Bayadhah Mosque
Bani Haritsah Mosque
Fas'h Mosque: located at the foot of Mount Uhad, according to tradition on the day of Uhud battle Muhammad and his companions had offered Dhuhr prayer here.
Manartain mosque
Masla mosque
Mosque of Al-Badeer (also known as Abi Zher mosque)
Mosque of Al-Bada'e
Mosque of Al-Fadeekh
Mosque of Al-Meekat
Mosque of Al-Saqiya
Mosque of Ali Bin Abu-Talib
Mosque of Atban Bin Dawood
Mosque of Bin yaqoob  (also known as Baghla mosque)
Mosque of Marwa Haram
Mosque of Meghisla (also known as Bani Dinar mosque)
Mosque of Aisha
Thaniyat Al-Wada'e mosque
The Seven Mosques
Tooshah Mosque

Abbasids
Al-Djumu'a mosque

Ayyubids
Sulaidah Al-mishah mosque

Mamluks
Mosque of Al-Ghamama, is located where according to tradition Muhammad offered Salat ul-Istasqa when the city of Madina faced a shortage of rain, later on a small mosque was established during the reign of Umar Ibn 'Abdulaziz.

Ottomans and Alawiyya Dynasty
Mosque of el-Anbareia
Mosque of Fatma Al-Zahra'

Modern
Al-Sharif mosque
Bin Hafeez Mosque
Bokhari Mosque
Green mosque
Mosque Ajlan
Mosque Al-Ahmada
Mosque Albulihishi
Mosque and Wasil ibn Muheisen Radadi
Mosque of Mohammed Ben Bachir
Mosque Jarbou
Mosque Muslim ibn al-Hamid
Mosque of Juhani
Mosque of Markaz
Mosque of Muhammad Khalil Effendi
Tagouri mosque

See also
 Holiest sites in Islam
 List of mosques
 List of mosques in Saudi Arabia
 Lists of mosques

References

External links

Complete compendium of Mosques in Medina on Madain Project

List|Mosques
Medina
Mosques in Medina